The Jungle Creek Formation is a geologic formation in Yukon. It preserves fossils dating back to the Permian period.

See also

 List of fossiliferous stratigraphic units in Yukon

References
 

Permian Yukon
Permian northern paleotemperate deposits